John McNulta (November 9, 1837 – February 22, 1900) was a U.S. Representative from Illinois.

Biography
Born in New York City, McNulta pursued an academic course and visited the West Indies and Europe.
He moved to Attica, Indiana, in 1853 and to Bloomington, Illinois, in 1859.
At one point, he engaged in the manufacture of cigars.
During the Civil War, McNulta served in the Union Army with the 1st Regiment Illinois Volunteer Cavalry and the 94th Illinois Volunteer Infantry Regiment.

He studied law and was admitted to the bar in 1865 and commenced the practice of law in Bloomington, Illinois.
He served as member of the State senate 1869–1873.

McNulta was elected as a Republican to the Forty-third Congress (March 4, 1873 – March 3, 1875).
He was an unsuccessful candidate for reelection in 1874 to the Forty-fourth Congress.
McNulta later resumed his legal practice. He died in Washington, D.C., on February 22, 1900, and is interred in Evergreen Cemetery, Bloomington, Illinois.

References

John McNulta at McLean County Museum of History

1837 births
1900 deaths
Politicians from New York City
Union Army colonels
Republican Party Illinois state senators
Republican Party members of the United States House of Representatives from Illinois
People from Attica, Indiana
People from Bloomington, Illinois
19th-century American politicians
Military personnel from Illinois